Harbor Command is an American police series that was syndicated from October 11, 1957, to July 4, 1958. The series stars Wendell Corey as Captain Ralph Baxter, an officer of the Harbor Police of a large coastal city (the city is unnamed, but much of the series was filmed in San Francisco and San Diego). The series was produced by Ziv Television Programs, with the assistance of the law enforcement arms of Harbor and Port Authorities across the country.  Captain Richard Storm, of the Port of San Diego's Harbor Police, was credited as the technical adviser for the series.

Guest stars
 Fred Aldrich
 Rayford Barnes
 Ray Boyle
 Bill Cassady
 Jack Hogan
 Harry Holcombe
 Ray Kellogg
 Joan Marshall
 Peter Marshall
 Ken Mayer
 Joyce Meadows 
 Ed Nelson
 Leonard Nimoy
 Edmond O'Brien
 Richard O'Brien
 Ronnie Schell
 Gary Vinson
 John Vivyan
 Patrick Waltz

Episodes

DVD release
On September 17, 2013, Timeless Media Group released Harbor Command- The Complete Series on DVD in Region 1 for the very first time.

See also
Seaway

References

External links
 
 Harbor Command at CVTA

1957 American television series debuts
1958 American television series endings
1950s American drama television series
1950s American police procedural television series
American action television series
Black-and-white American television shows
English-language television shows
First-run syndicated television programs in the United States
Television series by Ziv Television Programs
Television shows filmed in California